Events in the year 1868 in Brazil.

Incumbents
Monarch – Pedro II.
Prime Minister – Zacarias de Góis e Vasconcelos (until 16 July), Viscount of Itaboraí (starting 16 July).

Events

Births

Deaths

References

 
1860s in Brazil
Years of the 19th century in Brazil
Brazil
Brazil